Murder with Peacocks is a book written by Donna Andrews and published by Thomas Dunne Books (now owned by Macmillan Publishers) in 1999, which later went on to win in the Anthony Award for Best First Novel in 2000.

References 

Anthony Award-winning works
American mystery novels
1999 American novels
Thomas Dunne Books books
1999 debut novels